Antonis Alexakis (born 2 July 2001) is a Greek professional footballer who plays as a midfielder for Super League 2 club Irodotos.

Career statistics

Club

References

2001 births
Living people
Super League Greece 2 players
Ergotelis F.C. players
Association football midfielders
Footballers from Heraklion
Greek footballers